Mezzanotte d'amore (Italian for Midnight of love) is a 1970 Italian "musicarello" film directed by Ettore Maria Fizzarotti and starring Al Bano and Romina Power. It is the sequel of Il suo nome è Donna Rosa.

Cast 

 Romina Power as  Rosetta Belmonte 
 Al Bano as Andrea 
 Dolores Palumbo as  Maria,  Andrea's Mother 
 Stelvio Rosi as  Giorgio De Barberis 
 Nino Terzo as  Gaetano  
 Enzo Cannavale as  Gennarino  
 Carlo Taranto as  Francesco  
 Nino Vingelli as Ferdinando  
 Lino Banfi as The Revenue Officer
 Ignazio Balsamo as The Carabiniere 
 Walter Brugiolo: as Pietro
 Nino Taranto as  Antonio Belmonte 
 Bice Valori as  Rosa De Barberis 
 Paolo Panelli as Paolo De Barberis
 Nicoletta Elmi as Rosy

References

External links

1970 films
Musicarelli
1970s musical comedy films
Films directed by Ettore Maria Fizzarotti
1970 comedy films
1970s Italian films